Steve Tucker (born March 4, 1969) is an American rower. He competed at the 2004 Summer Olympics in Athens, where he placed 7th in the men's lightweight double sculls, along with Greg Ruckman. Tucker was born in Mooresville, Indiana.<ref></ref

References

External links

1969 births
Living people
American male rowers
Olympic rowers of the United States
Rowers at the 2000 Summer Olympics
Rowers at the 2004 Summer Olympics
World Rowing Championships medalists for the United States